The Brisbane Rugby League (otherwise known as the CAOS BRL Premier A Grade due to sponsorship purposes; formerly known as the Quest Cup, Mixwell Cup, FOGS Cup and In Safe Hands Cup) is a ten-team competition,  expanded from a six-team competition in 2020. It is the division below the Queensland Cup and is generally regarded as the successor competition to the original Brisbane Rugby League which folded in 1997.

History 
It started in 2001, then known as the Quest Cup, changing its name to the Mixwell Cup in 2003, and becoming the FOGS Cup in 2006. FOGS in an acronym for Former Origin Greats.

On 26 September 2014, the South East Queensland Division of the QRL announced that they would dissolve the current structure of the FOGS Cup and reform the Brisbane Rugby League.

Clubs 
It was announced in August 2019 that Queensland Cup clubs would withdraw their direct team presence and instead formalise affiliate relationships with local clubs in an effort to expand the competition and create opportunities for players at the local level, seeing many local clubs return to A-Grade level.

2022 season

Premiership winners 

Note:†: These teams achieved the minor premiership.

See also

 Queensland Cup
 Queensland Rugby League
 Rugby League Competitions in Australia

References

External links

Rugby league competitions in Queensland
Rugby league in Brisbane
Queensland Rugby League
Sports leagues established in 2001
2001 establishments in Australia